Numu may refer to:
Blacksmiths of western Africa
Northern Paiute language
Paiute (disambiguation)
New Museum Los Gatos

Language and nationality disambiguation pages